Montenegro–Palestine relations, refers to the bilateral relations between Montenegro and Palestine. Palestine recognized the independence of Montenegro on 24 July 2006 and the nations established diplomatic relations on 1 August 2006. Montenegro supports Palestine's demand for sovereignty over the territories occupied in 1967, and there is joint cooperation in cultural heritage and tourism.  Both countries are members of the Union for the Mediterranean.

References 

Palestine
Montenegro
Montenegro–State of Palestine relations